Swan Oo Ponnya Shin is a Buddhist pagoda located in Sagaing, Myanmar. The pagoda was purportedly founded in 1312 by Ponnya, a junior minister at the court of King Thihathu of Myinsaing–Pinya. The pagoda is located at the top of the second highest mountain in Sagaing, called Ponnya Shin Hill.

References 

Pagodas in Myanmar